The 2020 Women's Water Polo Olympic Qualification Tournament took place in Trieste, Italy. The top two teams advanced to the Olympics.

The tournament was scheduled to take place in March and then from 17 to 24 May 2020, but was postponed due to the COVID-19 pandemic. It then took place from 19 to 24 January 2021 and was held behind closed doors.

Due to their semifinal win, both Hungary and the Netherlands qualified for the Olympics.

Participants

Draw
The draw took place on 11 February 2020 in Lausanne, Switzerland.

Preliminary round
All times are local (UTC+1).

Group A

Group B

Knockout stage

Bracket

Fifth place bracket

Quarterfinals

5–8th place semifinals

Semifinals

Seventh place game

Fifth place game

Third place game

Final

Final ranking

See also
2020 Men's Water Polo Olympic Qualification Tournament

References

External links
FINA website
Results
Results book

Water Polo
Olympic
Water polo
Water Polo, Women's, Olympic Qualification Tournament, 2020
Women's Water Polo Olympic Qualification Tournament
Sport in Trieste
2021 in Italian women's sport